Lens Technology (Chinese: 蓝思科技) is a Chinese technology company headquartered in Hunan that engages in the research, development, manufacture, and sale of lens products. It produces and sells touch panel cover glass, touch sensor modules, and touch panel covers.

Lens Technology is a member of the Forbes 2000 list with a market cap of over $22 billion as of Jan 2021.

Its founder, Zhou Qunfei, is the world's richest woman whose fortune is self made.

In December 2020, the company was reported to be using forced labor from Uyghur Muslims in their factories. Some workers were given the choice between working at a factory or being sent to a detention center.

References

Chinese companies established in 2003
Manufacturing companies based in Hunan
Companies based in Changsha